FOX 35 may refer to one of the following television stations in the United States affiliated with the Fox Broadcasting Company:

Current
KION-DT2, a digital channel of KION-TV in Monterey/Salinas/Santa Cruz, California (branded as Fox 35)
WOFL in Orlando, Florida (O&O)
WRLH-TV in Richmond, Virginia

Former
KCBA in Monterey/Salinas/Santa Cruz, California (1986 to 2022)
KRRT (now KMYS) in Kerrville/San Antonio, Texas (1986 to 1995)
KKVI/KXTF in Twin Falls, Idaho (1996 to 2012)
WUFX (now WLOO) in Jackson, Mississippi (2003 to 2006)